Paolo Fabbri may refer to:

 Paolo Fabbri (musicologist) (born 1948), Italian musicologist
 Paolo Fabbri (semiotician) (1939–2020), Italian semiotician
 Paolo Fabbri, character in L'isola di Montecristo played by Claudio Gora

See also 
 Via Paolo Fabbri 43, a 1976 album by Francesco Guccini